Bernard Gruver (June 25, 1923 – June 14, 1985) was best known as one of the original animators of the Peanuts cartoon series.  He also was an animation professor at the University of Southern California School of Cinema.  He died of pneumonia following treatment for leukemia in 1985. Happy New Year, Charlie Brown was dedicated to him.

References

External links
Dan Bessie on Bernie Gruver

1923 births
1985 deaths
American cartoonists
Animation educators
Deaths from pneumonia in California
University of Southern California faculty